The Football Association of Ireland (FAI) is the governing body for association football in the Republic of Ireland.

Organisation

The FAI has an executive committee of five members under the President, who receive expenses, as well as a paid administrative staff led by the general secretary Joe Murphy. There is also a General Council of delegates who vote at the AGM. As well as the senior clubs, the General Council includes delegates from a variety of affiliated organisations:
 Provincial FAs for Leinster, Munster, Connacht and Ulster (the last only for the 3 Ulster counties not in Northern Ireland).
 Separate education associations for primary schools, secondary schools, universities, and other third-level institutes
 Junior (i.e. non-League) league football
 Women's FAI
 Referees
 Defence Forces
 SFAI

Recent changes have been made to the organisational structure following the publication of the "Genesis II" report (a non-independent report produced by and for the FAI, following the publication of the independent and highly critical Genesis report) of 2005. This includes the reorganisation of the national football league system in line with the recommendations.

Activity
The League of Ireland actually predated the FAI by three months. The FAI Cup was immediately established along the lines of the FA Cup and Scottish Cup competitions. A second cup competition was formed in 1974 called the League of Ireland Cup. The FAI Junior Cup and FAI Intermediate Cup are for non-League of Ireland teams. The Setanta Cup was inaugurated in 2005 as cross-border competition between FAI clubs from the League of Ireland and IFA clubs from the Irish League. There is also an Under 19 League of Ireland. The President of Ireland's Cup, a game between the previous season's League of Ireland and FAI Cup winners, was inaugurated in 2014.

The FAI also organises schools competitions, and international teams, including the senior team, underage teams, and the Olympic team.

History

Split from the IFA
The FAI was formed in Dublin in September 1921 by the Free State League (League of Ireland), founded the previous June, and the Leinster FA, which had withdrawn from the IFA in June. This was the climax of a series of disputes about the alleged Belfast bias of the IFA. The IFA had been founded in 1880 in Belfast as the governing body for football for the whole of Ireland, which was then a single part ("Home Nation") of the United Kingdom. The Leinster FA was an affiliate founded in 1892 to foster the game in Leinster, outside its Ulster heartland. In 1920, all but two clubs in the Irish League were based in Ulster, most of which was to become Northern Ireland the following year. While this largely reflected the balance of footballing strength within Ireland, southern clubs felt the IFA was doing little to promote the game outside the professional clubs in its heartland. Elsewhere association football was under pressure from the Gaelic Athletic Association (GAA), which banned members from playing or watching association football as being a "foreign" game. The First World War increased the gulf as the Irish League was suspended and replaced by regional leagues, foreshadowing the ultimate split. The Belfast members were mainly unionist, while the Dublin members were largely nationalist. Tensions were exacerbated by the Irish War of Independence of 1919–21, which disrupted contact between northern and southern clubs and prevented resumption of the Irish League. The security situation prompted the IFA to order the April 1921 Irish Cup semi-final replay between Glenavon and Shelbourne to be replayed in Belfast, rather than Dublin as convention dictated. This proved the final straw.

Both bodies initially claimed to represent the entire island. The split between Southern Ireland (which in 1922 became the Irish Free State) and Northern Ireland did not produce a split in the governing bodies of other sports, such as the Irish Rugby Football Union. The Munster Football Association, originally dominated by British Army regiments, had fallen into abeyance on the outbreak of the First World War, and was re-established in 1922 with the help of the FAI, to which it affiliated. The Falls League, based in the Falls Road of nationalist West Belfast, affiliated to the FAI, and from there Alton United won the FAI Cup in 1923. However, when the FAI applied to join FIFA in 1923, it was admitted as the FAIFS (Football Association of the Irish Free State) based on a 26-county jurisdiction.  (This jurisdiction remains, although Derry City, from Northern Ireland, were given an exemption, by agreement of FIFA and the IFA, to join the League of Ireland in 1985.) Attempts at reconciliation followed: at a 1923 meeting, the IFA rejected an FAIFS proposal for it to be an autonomous subsidiary of the FAIFS. A 1924 meeting in Liverpool, brokered by the English FA, almost reached agreement on a federated solution, but the IFA insisted on providing the chairman of the International team selection committee.  A 1932 meeting agreed on sharing this role, but foundered when the FAIFS demanded one of the IFA's two places on the International Football Association Board. Further efforts to reach agreement were made through a series of conferences between the IFA and FAI from 1973 to 1980 during the height of the Northern Ireland Troubles.

The IFA did not feel obliged to refrain from selecting Free State players for its international team. The name Football Association of Ireland was readopted by the FAIFS in 1936, in anticipation of the change of the state's name in the pending Constitution of Ireland, and the FAI began to select players from Northern Ireland based on the Constitution's claim to sovereignty there. A number of players played for both the FAI "Ireland" (against FIFA members from mainland Europe) and the IFA "Ireland" (in the British Home Championship, whose members had withdrawn from FIFA in 1920). Shortly after the IFA rejoined FIFA in 1946, the FAI stopped selecting Northern players. The IFA stopped selecting southern players after the FAI complained to FIFA in 1950.

Summary
1880 – IFA founded in Belfast, representing all of Ireland ("Ireland")
1921 – FAI founded in Dublin, representing Southern Ireland ("Irish Free State")
1936 – FAI begins also selecting Northern players ("Ireland"/"Éire")
1946 – FAI stops selecting Northern players ("Republic of Ireland" as of 1954)
1950 – IFA stops selecting Southern players ("Northern Ireland" as of 1954)
Therefore,
IFA (today Northern Ireland) represents all of Ireland between 1880 and 1950
FAI (today Republic of Ireland) represents all of Ireland between 1936 and 1946

Consolidation
For many years, association football was largely confined to Dublin and a few provincial towns.  In some towns the game had been started by British Army teams, leading to the derisory nickname the "garrison game". Association football was played in relatively few schools: middle-class schools favoured rugby union while others favoured Gaelic games. From the late 1960s, association football began to achieve more widespread popularity. Donogh O'Malley, TD, the then Minister for Education, began a new programme of state-funded schools in 1966, many with association football pitches and teams. The Gaelic Athletic Association's ban on members playing "foreign" games was lifted in 1971.  RTÉ television, founded in 1962, and British television (available nearly everywhere on cable or microwave relay from the 1970s), broadcast association football regularly.  Above all, the increasing success of the international side from the late 1980s gave increased television exposure, more fans, and more funds to the FAI.

Since 1988
However, increased media exposure also highlighted some inadequacies of its hitherto largely amateur organisation.

In January 1999, the FAI announced a planned national association football stadium, to be called Eircom Park after primary sponsors Eircom. This was to be a 45,000-seat stadium in City West, modelled on the Gelredome in Arnhem. It gradually became apparent that the initial forecasts of cost and revenue had been very optimistic.  FAI and public support for project was also undermined by the announcement of the Stadium Ireland in Abbotstown, which would have 65,000 seats and be available free to the FAI, being funded by the state. The Eircom Park project was finally abandoned in March 2001, amid much rancour within the FAI.

During preparation for the 2002 World Cup, the captain of the senior football team, Roy Keane, left the training camp and returned to his home.  He was critical of many aspects of the organisation and preparation of the team for the upcoming games, and public opinion in Ireland was divided. As a result of the incident, the FAI commissioned a report from consultants Genesis into its World Cup preparations. The "Genesis Report" made a number of damning criticisms regarding corruption and cronyism within the association, but was largely ignored. The complete report was never published for legal reasons. The FAI subsequently produced its own report of itself titled "Genesis II" and implemented a number of its recommendations.

In 2002, the FAI announced a deal with British Sky Broadcasting to sell broadcasting rights to Ireland's international matches, as well as domestic association football, to be televised on its satellite subscription service.  The general public felt it should be on RTÉ, the free-to-air terrestrial service, in spite of their offering much lower rates.  Faced with the prospect of the government legislating to prevent any deal, the FAI agreed to accept an improved, but still lower, offer from RTÉ.

In 2002, the FAI made an unsuccessful bid with the Scottish Football Association to host UEFA Euro 2008.

Following the respectable performance of the national team in the 2002 World Cup, the team's fortunes declined under the management of Mick McCarthy, Brian Kerr and Steve Staunton.

In September 2006, Lars-Christer Olsson, CEO of UEFA, was quoted as anticipating that Lansdowne Road in Dublin (actually owned by the Irish Rugby Football Union) would stage the UEFA Cup Final in 2010, and that the FAI and the IFA would co-host the 2011 UEFA European Under-21 Football Championship.  The 2010 final was ultimately awarded to Hamburg, but in January 2009, UEFA named Lansdowne Road as the host stadium for the renamed 2011 UEFA Europa League Final. In August 2010, an FAI spokesman said they will have repaid all of their stadium debt of €46 million within 10 years despite the disastrous sale of 10-year tickets for premium seats at the Aviva Stadium.

In November 2007 the FAI moved to new headquarters at the Sports Campus Ireland in Abbotstown. Its headquarters since the 1930s had been a Georgian terraced house at 80 Merrion Square, which was sold for a sum variously reported as "in excess of €6m" and "almost €9m".

Principals

*First full-time secretary since 1928, Ryder died in November 1935

**Delaney was interim CEO from 2004–2006

***COO Rea Walshe replaced Delaney as Interim CEO, John Foley was due to be appointed CEO but withdrew, Paul Cooke then became Interim CEO but was succeeded by Gary Owens until Hill's appointment

Management structure
The Association's structure can best be split into three sections: the FAI Council, The Board of Management and Committees, and the FAI Administration Staff.

The FAI Council is made up of 60 members from across the Irish football family. The Council elects the FAI's president, a number of committee members and also pass major decisions. The Board of Management has ten members: the president, vice-president, honorary secretary, honorary treasurer, chief executive, and the six chairpersons of the Development (International, Domestic, League of Ireland, Legal/Corporate & Underage committees). The Finance committee is represented by the Honorary Treasurer rather than selecting a chairperson. A number of committee members elected by Council and a further number selected by the CEO, President and Council Representative (other than an officer). For balance within the committees, the person selected cannot be from the same affiliate as the person elected by council, while no one person can sit on more than two committees. The Chief Executive also sits as a voting member on the Finance and Legal and Corporate Affairs Committees.

Controversies
The FAI has been involved in a number of scandals and controversies during its existence, the most famous being the "Merriongate" controversy, which broke in 1996 when the media reported that in the 1990 and 1994 World Cups, the FAI had sought to acquire extra tickets for Ireland's matches by exchanging tickets it had been allocated for other games; sometimes with the relevant FAs, but sometimes with ticket touts.  The FAI was left with many unsold tickets and heavy losses from these transactions. ("Merriongate" refers to the FAI's then-headquarters in Merrion Square, Dublin).

The 2007 season saw the FAI start a five-year term of running the League of Ireland after merging with the League.  There was controversy over the manner in which clubs were allocated between the two divisions of the new League, as simple promotion and relegation from the previous season's leagues was not used, but rather a weighting of results, infrastructure and finances.

In 2010 the FAI refused to sanction a high-profile friendly between Limerick F.C. and FC Barcelona in Thomond Park, at first citing a clash of fixtures, despite none of the games involving Limerick. It was later revealed that the reason for the refusal to sanction was due to an agreement the Association had in place whereby any game with a capacity of more than 20,000 had to be agreed with by a third-party, and that the FAI was in discussions about organising their own friendly with Barcelona (which the Catalan giants later refuted). When asked if Limerick could hold the friendly if they agreed to cap the attendance at 19,990, the FAI then informed the press that the limit in the contract was in fact 15,000. This apparent back-tracking, combined with abject media performances by John Delaney and Fran Gavin when attempting to justify the FAI decision, was seen as a further slap in the face for the League of Ireland, many of whose clubs were in serious financial danger.

Shortly before this scandal, the FAI announced the first association football game to take place in the Aviva Stadium was to be between Manchester United and a League of Ireland XI. When the announcement was made, it was mentioned that this game would potentially clash with a Bohemians Champions League qualifier, should the club progress. The FAI responded by announcing negotiations with UEFA about a fixture change, which contradicted its decision not to grant the Limerick game due to a fixture clash with other Irish clubs.
It was also noted that the game was set up directly by the FAI and not the supposed third-party, despite the attendance being over 15,000. The game itself was seen as a humiliation for the League of Ireland, as the FAI looked to have turned their back once again on Irish clubs in order to accommodate Premier League fans.

After the Aviva Stadium curtain-raiser, the FAI announced that they had debts of €38 million, and had only sold 6,300 Vantage Club tickets from a projected 10,000. This was at a time when the Chief Executive, John Delaney, earned €430,000, double what 2010 League of Ireland Champions received in prize money. The figure of 6,300 was later questioned by an Irish Independent report which suggested in fact only 4,077 tickets had been sold, with as many as 1,000 of those 4,077 have been allocated to 10-year ticket holders, mainly taken by financial institutions who have not paid for the tickets since the project began.

Vantage Club
When the Aviva Stadium was built, the FAI launched an ambitious premium debenture ticket scheme called the Vantage Club to help fund the association's share of the renovation costs. In September 2008, when the scheme was launched, it was estimated by the FAI that they needed to sell only 60% of the 10,000 seats to break even. However, by 2019, just over 4,000 seats had been 'allocated' according to the FAI.

Finances 2016 - 2020

Bridging loan
FAI Chief Executive John Delaney confirmed he gave the association a €100,000 loan to help it through what he said was a short-term cash flow problem. In a statement on behalf of Mr Delaney, the FAI said the "bridging loan" was given in April 2017 and repaid in full to Mr Delaney in June of that year. In a second statement issued by the FAI, Mr Delaney expanded on his comments. He said he acted in the best interests of the Association, at a time, he said, when immediate funding was needed. He described the loan as "a matter of timing," adding the loan had no impact on the full financial position or performance of the FAI for the year. In April 2019, John Delaney appeared before the Oireachtas Committee on Tourism, Transport and Sport, stating he was precluded from making any further comments at this hearing in relation to the finances of the Association or his former role as CEO or the €100,000 loan. The chairman of the Leinster Senior League then called for a change in how Irish football was run, revealing that a large number of the leading amateur league's clubs were "not confident in the direction the FAI board is taking". David Moran told RTÉ Sport that the LSL committee had written to its 138 member clubs asking whether the Association's board should resign in the wake of revelations over a €100,000 loan from former FAI chief executive John Delaney to his employers.

Hidden losses
Accounts for 2016 and 2017 were amended in December 2019, replacing reported profits with losses.

With liquidation of the association a possibility, the men's national team's participation in the Euro 2020 play-offs was under threat due to the funding crisis.

The FAI's CEO changed four times between 2019 and January 2020. Delaney resigned from the post in September 2019, with Gary Owens, former CEO of IFG Group, appointed to replace him the following January  and former International and former chairman of Sunderland F.C., Niall Quinn, appointed as interim deputy CEO, choosing to go without salary until the financial future of the organisation could be secured. In January 2020, former board member Gerry McAnaney replaced Donal Conway as president.

See also
 FAI International Football Awards

References

External links
FAI Website
History from the Website
 Republic of Ireland at FIFA site
 Republic of Ireland at UEFA site

 
Ireland
Football
 
1921 establishments in Ireland
Sports organizations established in 1921